Thomas Traynor (27 September 1943 – January 1993) was a Scottish footballer who played as a winger. Traynor spent the majority of his career with Heart of Midlothian and Dundee United, gaining Scottish Cup runners-up medals with both, in 1968 and 1974 respectively. Traynor also had short spells with Morton and Falkirk. He was a coach with Cowdenbeath after his playing retirement before moving to Australia, where he died from a heart attack.

Honours
Heart of Midlothian
Scottish Cup finalist: 1967–68

Dundee United
Scottish Cup finalist: 1973–74

External links 

1943 births
1993 deaths
Scottish footballers
Heart of Midlothian F.C. players
Dundee United F.C. players
Greenock Morton F.C. players
Falkirk F.C. players
Footballers from Falkirk (council area)
Association football wingers
Scottish Football League players
Scottish emigrants to Australia
Scottish Junior Football Association players
Dunipace F.C. players
People from Bonnybridge